The Longstone of Minchinhampton is a standing stone on Minchinhampton Common, Minchinhampton in Gloucestershire, England. The stone is clearly visible in a field accessible via the southeast road out of the village. Tradition suggests that passing infants through one of the holes will cure them of illnesses such as measles or whooping cough.

Geology
Nearby,  to the south west, there is a fallen standing stone which has been built into a dry stone wall, and may have once formed a stone pair with the Longstone. The area has numerous barrows and near the Longstone ornaments, flint and arrowheads have all been found.

Lore
Attempts to pull the Longstone out with oxen failed as "something" stopped it from being moved, so the stone remained in the field. The stone was believed to be able to cure infants of maladies such as measles and whooping cough, by passing the child through one of the natural holes. A myth amongst children at the beginning of the 20th century was that the Longstone would run around the field at the stroke of midnight.

The menhir is supposedly the burial site of one of the Danish leaders, after a battle at Woeful Danes' Bottom, nearby. Other tales suggest that the stone was in place for the battle, with soldiers shooting through the holes and that the nearby tumuli are the graves of the soldiers.

Notes

External links
 The Longstone, Hampton Fields at minchinhamptonlocalhistorygroup.org.uk
 

Stone Age sites in England
Archaeological sites in Gloucestershire
Buildings and structures in Gloucestershire
Tourist attractions in Gloucestershire